This is a list of famous or notable persons considered Frisians by citizenship, ethnicity or nationality.

A
 Bernard Accama (1697–1756), 18th-century painter from Friesland
 Lawrence Alma-Tadema (1836–1912), Dutch painter from Dronrijp
 Stine Andresen (1849–1927), poet from Föhr who also wrote in Fering; befriended poet Friedrich Hebbel

B
 Nicolaas Baur (1736–1817), portrait painter from Harlingen
 Eggerik Beninga (1490–1562), East Frisian chronicler
 William Bergsma (1921–1994), American composer of Frisian descent
 Titus Brandsma (1881–1942), Carmelite priest of the Roman Catholic Church, anti-Nazi Dutch resistance voice
 Hinrich Braren (1751–1826), nautical examiner from Föhr; wrote the first textbook on navigation in German language
 Oluf Braren (1787–1839), painter from Föhr
 Dan Bylsma, NHL head coach for the Pittsburgh Penguins (born 1970), of Frisian descent

C
 Franciscus Carree (c. 1630), was made the first painter of William Frederick, Prince of Nassau-Dietz
 Peter Harry Carstensen (born 1947), Minister-President of Schleswig-Holstein from 2005 to 2012

D
 Edsger Dijkstra (1930–2002), computer scientist
 Everett Dirksen (1896-1969), American politician of the Republican Party; parents were born in East Frisia 
 Pier Gerlofs Donia (1480–1520), Frisian freedom fighter and folk hero; founder of the Arumer Black Heap
 Lenny Dykstra, Major League baseball player for the New York Mets (1985–1989) and Philadelphia Phillies (1989–1996)

E
 Fred Eaglesmith, Canadian folk singer; original last name was Elgersma
 Gerard Edema (1652–1700?), Dutch landscape-painter who settled in England
 Edzard the Great (1461–1528), count of East Frisia from 1491 until his death in 1528
 Dieter Eilts, football (soccer) player; nicknamed the Alemão of East Frisia; won the UEFA European Championship 1996 with Germany
 Eise Eisinga (1744–1828), Frisian amateur astronomer and builder of the oldest working planetaria in the world
 Ubbo Emmius (1547–1625), professor of history and Greek
 Heiko Engelkes (1933–2008), German journalist born in Norden, East Frisia
 Jens Jacob Eschels (1757–1842), seafarer and entrepreneur; became known by his autobiography
 Maurits Cornelis Escher (1898–1972), graphic artist born in Leeuwarden
 Balthasar Oomkens von Esens (died 1540), East Frisian nobleman who opposed House Cirksena
 Rudolf Eucken (1846–1926), German philosopher; winner of the 1908 Nobel Prize for Literature

F
 David Fabricius (1564–1617), astronomer and theologian
 Johannes Fabricius (1587–1616), astronomer and a discoverer of sunspots, independently of Galileo Galilei
 Pieter Feddes van Harlingen (1586–1623), Dutch Golden Age painter
 Bernard Fokke (1600–1641), on whom the Flying Dutchman is said to be based
 Jane Fonda, actress with Frisian ancestry
 Magnus Forteman (~809), legendary commander and magistrate governor of Friesland
 William Frankena (1908–1994), American philosopher of Ethics; scholar in history of ethics; played role in controversies of the 1950s
 Josh Freese, American musician of Frisian descent
 Gemma Frisius (1508–1555), mathematician and cartographer

G
 Ygo Gales Galama (1443–1493), infamous medieval warlord; Galama-family patriarch
 Wybrand de Geest (1592 – c. 1661), Dutch Golden Age portrait painter
 Pieter Sjoerds Gerbrandy (1885–1961), prime minister of the Dutch government in exile during World War II

H
 Tamme Hanken (1960–2016), German horse whisperer and bonesetter from Filsum
 Mata Hari (born Margaretha Geertruida Zelle, August 7, 1876, in Leeuwarden, Friesland), infamous dancer, courtesan; executed as a spy in France, October 1917
 Wiebbe Hayes (born c. 1608), Colonial soldier hero from Winschoten
Grant Hayunga (born 1970), painter and musician
Simon Heere Heeresma (1932–2011), Dutch author and poet
Hendrik Eelke Hiddinga (1942), Professional cyclist
Meindert Hobbema (1638-1709), Dutch Golden Age painter

I
 Dodo zu Innhausen und Knyphausen (1583–1636), professional soldier from Lütetsburg, East Frisia; field marshal in Swedish service during the Thirty Years' War (1618–1648)
 Ub Iwerks (1901–1971), American animator, cartoonist, character designer, inventor, and special effects technician; co-created Mickey Mouse

J
 Gysbert Japiks (1603–1666), Frisian writer, poet, schoolteacher and cantor
 Wijard Jelckama (1490–1523), Frisian freedom fighter, nephew of Pier Gerlofs Donia and who later led the Frisian rebellion (Arumer Black Heap)
 Tako Hajo Jelgersma (1702–1795), 18th-century Dutch painter
 Carl Ludwig Jessen (1833–1917), North Frisian Naturalist painter

K
 Wilhelm von Knyphausen (1716–1800), general from Hesse-Cassel; fought in the American Revolutionary War, during which he led Hessian mercenaries on behalf of the British Empire
 Tjalling Koopmans (1910-1985), Dutch American mathematician and economist; Nobel Prize Laureate in Economic Sciences
 Sven Kramer, Dutch long track speed skater
 Doutzen Kroes (born January 23, 1985, in Eastermar, Friesland), Dutch supermodel

L
 Anna-Marie Lampe, Playboy magazine (US edition) 40th anniversary Playmate/Playmate of the Month for January 1994; Playboy magazine (Dutch edition) Playmate of the year for 1995
 Cynthia Lenige (1755–1780), poet
 Abe Lenstra (1920–1985), Dutch football player and national football icon in the 1950s
 Boy Lornsen (1922–1995), author and sculptor from Sylt, Germany
 Jack Lousma, astronaut with Frisian ancestry

M
 Theodor Mommsen (1817–1903), received the Nobel Prize in Literature in 1902; German politician, member of the Prussian and German parliaments
Hans Momsen (1735–1811), North Frisian farmer, layman mathematician and astronomer
 F. W. Matthiessen (1835-1918) Born in Altona, Denmark, Descendant of Matthias Petersen (Matthias der Gluckliche), Co-Founder of Matthiessen and Hegeler Zinc Works in LaSalle, IL (USA), Founder of Westclox (now General Time), Philanthropist, Matthiessen State Park Deer Park, IL (USA)

O
 Hark Olufs (1708–1754), sailor from Amrum; was enslaved by Algerian pirates; eventually became Commander in Chief of the Bey of Constantine's cavalry
 Christian von Ompteda (1765–1815), commander in the Napoleonic Wars
 Jürgen Ovens (1623–1678), portrait painter from North Frisia; said to have been a pupil of Rembrandt

P
 Frederik Paulsen Sr (1909–1997), physician; founder of Ferring Pharmaceuticals
 Matthias Petersen (1632–1706), whaling captain from Föhr; in his lifetime he caught 373 whales
 Wolfgang Petersen, German movie director (Das Boot)
 David Petraeus, former four-star general in the United States Army, former Director of the Central Intelligence Agency; his father was a sea captain from Franeker, Netherlands
 Alvin Plantinga, American philosopher of Frisian descent
 Gerriet Postma (1932–2009), Dutch painter

R
 Hendrik van Rijgersma (1835–1877), physician and amateur botanist, malacologist and ichthyologist
 Rintje Ritsma, former Dutch long track speed skater

S
 Menno Simons (1496 – January 31, 1561), Anabaptist religious leader from Friesland whose followers became known as Mennonites
 Friede Springer (born 1942), widow of publisher Axel Springer; major shareholder of Axel Springer AG
 Theodor Storm (1817–1888), wrote Der Schimmelreiter
 Peter Stuyvesant (1612–1672), last Dutch Director-General of the colony of New Netherland (New York)

V
 Simon Vestdijk (1899–1971), novelist, musician, psychological analyst
 Jouke de Vries, Dutch PVDA politician

W
 Otto Waalkes, German comedian, actor and musician, born in Emden
 Hayley Westenra, singer from New Zealand; of some Frisian descent
 Harm Wiersma (born 1953 in Leeuwarden), six time world champion in draughts and politician
 Piter Wilkens (born 1959), Frisian folk and pop singer

Z
 Jelle Zijlstra (1918–2001), Prime Minister of the Netherlands 1966-67
 Wout Zijlstra, strongest man of the Netherlands in 2001; third of the world in 1998
 Epke Zonderland, gymnast, Olympic champion (2012)

See also

 List of Dutch people
 List of people from Amsterdam

References 

Frisians